Atlanta Falcons stadium may refer to:

 Atlanta–Fulton County Stadium
 Georgia Dome
 Mercedes-Benz Stadium

See also
 :Category:Atlanta Falcons stadiums